The July 2000 Chechnya suicide bombings happened on July 2-July 3, 2000, when Chechen insurgents launched five suicide bomb attacks on the Russian military and police headquarters and barracks within 24 hours. Russian officials claimed that six bombers killed at least 37 Russian troops (with four more missing) and 11 civilians, and wounded more than 100 people.

In the deadliest of the attacks, at least 26 people were killed and 81 wounded at OMON dormitory in Argun.

The Russian Interior Ministry for Chechnya based in Gudermes was targeted twice killing at least six troops. Following one of the bombings, a firefight broke out between Chechen guerillas and soldiers, killing three more soldiers.

References

Attacks in Russia in 2000
Mass murder in 2000
20th-century mass murder in Russia
2000 in Russia
Suicide bombing in the Chechen wars
Terrorist incidents in Russia in 2000
July 2000 events in Russia
2000 in Chechnya